Futboll Klub Partizani, or FK Partizani for short, is an Albanian professional football club based in Tirana, that competes in the Kategoria Superiore. Founded in 1946, the club was historically affiliated to the Albanian army. Partizani's current temporary home ground is Arena Kombëtare and the newly built stadium at Partizani Complex.

The club first competed in an official competition in 1947 where they won the Albania National Championship, thus being crowned the champions of Albania in their debut season as well as the following two seasons. In total the club have been national champions on 16 occasions between 1947 and 2019, which is the last time the club won the Kategoria Superiore. They have won 18 other officially recognised domestic honours, including 15 Albanian Cups as well as Second Division. They are also the only Albanian club side to have won an international football competition through their 1970 Balkans Cup campaign in which they beat Bulgarian side Beroe Stara Zagora in the final.

History

Foundation (1945–1946)
FK Partizani Tirana was officially founded on 4 February 1946 soon after the end of World War II and the liberation of Albania. However, one year earlier in 1945, there had been two military division teams competing in the first National Championship following the end of World War II. The teams were called Ylli Shkodër and Liria Korçë, and they were both dissolved as clubs at the end of the season, with their best players moving to Tiranë to join Ushtria, which literally translates to The Army. Ushtria played their first friendly game on 13 January 1946 against the reigning champions of Albania Vllaznia Shkodër, in a game that ended in a goalless draw in Tiranë that was played during heavy rainfall. The team played their first ever match in distinctive red shirts with each player's initials on their chests. The club's first ever lineup was Alfred Bonati, Luga, Tepelia, Xhavit Shyqyri Demneri, Besim Fagu, Rexhepi, Lutfi Hoxha, Qamil Teliti, Kavaja, Hamdi Bakalli and Bylyku. The following month, on 4 February, Ushtria was developed into an organised sports club which was to be named in honour of the Albanian Partisans who had fought for the liberation of the country. In the early history of the club they recruited players from the Scanderbeg Military High School and Albanian Military Academy, as well as players from other clubs who were ordered by the ruling Communists to play for Partizani.

On 7 April the club played their first official match under the name Partizani, which was against another team from the same city 17 Nëntori Tiranë. Partizani won the match 2–0 through the goals of Osman Pengili and Qamil Teliti, with a lineup consisting of Çobani, Tepeli, Muhamet Dibra, Besim Fagu, Kavaja, Osman Pengili, Lutfi Hoxha, Hivzi Sakiqi, Bylyku and Xhavit Shyqyri Demneri. As the club did not participate in the 1946 National Championship, they instead took a tour of Albania playing friendly games against some of the biggest clubs in the country at the time, and ended their 9 match tour with 26 goals scored and 9 against, and Qamil Teliti scoring 11 goals to make him the tour's top goalscorer.

Early dominance (1947–1964)

Partizani first competed in a national competition in 1947, where they were enrolled into the top flight of Albanian football in their debut season and played 16 games, winning 14, drawing 1 and losing 1 as they went on to win the National Championship in their first competitive campaign. They finished on 29 points, just 1 ahead of Vllaznia Shkodër, who had won the previous 2 National Championships, and they had a goal difference of 41, after scoring 56 goals and conceding 16. The championship winning team was managed by Sllave Llambi, and was made up of Abdulla Stërmasi, Kamberi, Ramazan Njala, Besim Fagu, Medo Cuciqi, Sulejman Vathi, Xhavit Shyqyri Demneri, Hivzi Sakiqi, Isuf Pelingu, Tafil Baci, Lutfi Hoxha, Osman Pengili, Hamdi Tafmizi, Zihni Gjinali, Zef Gavoci, Eqrem Dauti, Zyber Lisi, Alush Merhori and Hamdi Bakalli, who was also the league's top goalscorer with 7 goals. The following season the Albanian Football Association decided to change the format of the championship and divided teams into two groups based on geographical location, with Group A being a northern conference and Group B being a southern conference. Partizani were placed in Group A where they finished top of the group level on points with Vllaznia Shkodër, and due to possessing a better goal difference Partizani were the group winners and reached the championship final on 25 August 1947 against Flamurtari Vlorë. The final was played in Tiranë and Partizani won with an emphatic 6–2 scoreline, following goals from Vasif Biçaku, Xhevdet Shaqiri and four goals from Zihni Gjinali to give Partizani their second consecutive title. Gjinali was also the league's top goalscorer for the campaign, after finishing level on 11 goals with Flamurtari Vlorë forward Tish Daija, who also scored in the championship final. The Republic Cup also returned in 1948 and Partizani competed in the competition for the first time, and they also went on to win it following a 5–2 victory over local rivals 17 Nentori Tiranë in the final which secured the first double in Albanian football. They retained the league title the following season following an undefeated campaign, and they also retained the cup as they defeated 17 Nentori Tiranë 1–0 in the final.

Partizani finished the 1950 National Championship level on points with newly formed Interior Ministry team Dinamo Tirana, and despite having a superior goal difference the Albanian Football Association decided to award the title to Dinamo after using a strange mathematical calculation using goal statistics, which were 77:10 = 7.7 for Partizani and 60:6 = 10.0 for Dinamo. After losing out on the title to new local rivals Dinamo, Partizani also came runners up to them in the Republic Cup, which began a long period of football in Albania dominated by the 2 sides. The following season, the club finished as runners up to Dinamo in both the league and the cup, but 19 year old striker Refik Resmja managed to score 59 goals in 23 games for Partizani which gave him a 2.57 goalscoring average, a record that is considered to be the best ever in top flight football. 

Despite finishing level on points and with a greater goal difference than Dinamo during the 1952 campaign, the same strange mathematical calculation as in 1950 was used and the title was once again awarded to Dinamo. The following season they finished runners up in both the league and the cup to Dinamo, before winning the league title in 1954 which was their first trophy since 1949. The club also finished as runners up in the cup to Dinamo in the 1954 Republic Cup, before going off to compete in the third unofficial Championship of Communist Countries' Army Clubs held in Bulgaria, where they only managed to win 1 game and lose 3. They then finished as runners up again to Dinamo Tirana for the next 2 seasons, meaning Partizani won just 1 league title in the previous 7 years.

1957 marked the return of Partizani as the most dominant club in Albania, as they won the league and cup double, a feat they repeated once again in 1958 before competing in the first official Spartakiada, the Championship of Communist Countries' Army Clubs in East Germany. They defeated The Cong Hanoi of Vietnam, CCA București of Romania, Dukla Prague of Czechoslovakia and Vorwärts Berlin of East Germany to reach the final against CDNA Sofia of Bulgaria, who narrowly defeated Partizani 1–0 at the Leipzig Zentralstadion in front of 100,000 spectators. They returned to Albania with silver medals and used the experience to retain both the league and cup to complete consecutive doubles, and in 1959 they won just the league as the cup was not held that year. However, Dinamo won the double in 1960 as Partizani finished runners up in the league, but they completed the double themselves the following season and they became the first Albanian club to participate in a European competition in 1962, which occurred due to Albania's Communist leader Enver Hoxha falling out with the Soviet Union in 1960, meaning the domestic league formats were changed in line with Europe's and Albania no longer excluded themselves from competing in European competitions. Partizani faced Swedish champions IFK Norrköping in the first round of the UEFA European Cup and they lost the first leg 2–0 in Norrköping before earning a 1–1 draw in Tiranë, where rocks were thrown onto the pitch at the end of the match which ended in a 3–1 aggregate loss for Partizani. During the 1962–63 campaign Partizani once again won the league title and they were then drawn against Bulgarian Spartak Plovdiv side in the European Cup, and they won their first European game in the first leg as they defeated Spartak Plovdiv 1–0 in Tiranë, but they were eliminated after losing 3–1 in Plovdiv. The following season they completed the double, which would be their last of the communist era, and in December 1963, halfway through the season, Partizani competed in the third official Spartakiada, the second of which included football, held in Vietnam, and they defeated CDNA Sofia in a rematch of the previous final, as well as Budapest Honvéd of Hungary, and Vorwärts Berlin to reach the semi finals where they defeated Budapest Honvéd once again to reach the final against a team from the Soviet Union consisting of players from CSKA Moscow and SKA Rostov-on-Don, where they lost 2–0 after extra time to finish as runners up in consecutive Spartakiads. They faced German side 1. FC Köln in the European Cup at the start of the following season, and they drew 0–0 in the first leg in Tiranë, but lost 2–0 away in Cologne to lose the tie on aggregate. As Albania was a Stalinist state at the time, during the first leg the 1. FC Köln team was involved in a minor diplomatic incident arose when it was evident that the West Germans had brought their own food and a chef to cook it. 1. Köln's administrator Julius Ukrainczyk eventually negotiated a compromise that saw the food allowed in but the chef sent home.

Rise in opposition (1965–1993)
After winning their 10th league title in 17 years, Partizani struggled to maintain their dominance at the top of Albanian football, as they finished as runners up in 4 of the next 5 seasons, but they did win 3 consecutive Republic Cups between 1965 and 1970, as the cup was not held for 2 years during this period. They competed in the 1968–69 European Cup Winners' Cup where they were drawn against Italian side Torino, whom they defeated 1–0 in Tiranë before losing 3–1 in Turin to lose 3–2 on aggregate. In 1970 they became the first ad only Albanian club to win an international competition, as they defeated Beroe Stara Zagora to win the regional 1970 Balkans Cup, following a 1–1 draw in Tiranë and a 3–0 awarded win for the second leg, as Beroe withdrew. Partizani participated in the Cup Winners' Cup in 1970, and they faced Swedish side Åtvidabergs FF in the preliminary round where the drew 1–1 in Åtvidaberg before winning 2–0 in Tiranë to earn the club its first European tie victory as they moved into the last 16 where they faced Austrian side Wacker Innsbruck. Partizani lost 3–2 in the first leg in Innsbruck despite being ahead 2–1 at half time, and they lost 2–1 in the return leg at home, which was their first European home loss in 6 games. They won the 1970–71 National Championship which was their first title since 1964, and they qualified for the first round of the European Cup where they lost 4–0 on aggregate to Bulgarian side CSKA Sofia. They once again failed to retain their title and struggled the following season, finishing 4th in the league and being knocked out of the cup in the semi finals, before going on to win the cup during the 1972–73 season as well as finishing as runners up in the league. They finished as runners up the following season in both the league and cup, before failing to reach the final of the cup or finish in the top 2 of the league until 1979 which is when they managed to win their 11th league title ahead of local rivals KF Tirana. They then faced Scottish champions Celtic in the European Cup whom they defeated 1–0 in Tiranë. Once again Albania's communist regime made it difficult for foreign clubs to enter and play in Albania, and it took Celtic over 2 months to acquire visas for their players and staff and they were unable to acquire visas for press and a small number of supporters. The return leg ended in disappointment for Partizani as despite opening the scoring they lost 4–1, meaning they lost the tie 4–2 on aggregate.

Partizani once again failed to challenge for the title the following season, as they could only manage a 4th-place finish, but they won the cup after beating Labinoti Elbasan 2–1 on aggregate in the final. They qualified for the Cup Winners' Cup and faced Swedish side Malmö FF whom they narrowly lost 1–0 on aggregate following a 1–0 loss in Malmö and a goalless draw in Tiranë. The club won the 1980–81 National Championship ahead of Dinamo and KF Tirana, meaning they qualified for the European Cup where they faced Austrian side Austria Wien whom they lost 3–2 on aggregate to following a disappointing 3–1 first leg away loss and a 1–0 home win. The club had to wait until 1987 for their next trophy, which came in the shape of the National Championship which they won ahead of Flamurtari Vlorë. They faced Portuguese champions Benfica in an infamous first leg in Lisbon that saw Partizani lose 4–0 and end the game with 7 men as 4 players were sent off including goalkeeper and captain Perlat Musta. Partizani were punished by UEFA for the incidents, and they were knocked out of the competition following a walkover victory for Benfica in what would have been the second leg, and they were also banned from Europe for 4 years. Partizani finished 9th in the 1987–88 campaign, which was their lowest ever finish in the league and they also missed out on the cup as they lost in the final to Flamurtari Vlorë. They somewhat bounced back the following season as they finished as runners up in the league, a feat that was repeated for 4 seasons in a row. They competed in the UEFA Cup in 1990, where they lost to Romanian side Universitatea Craiova, and they also won the cup in 1991 after beating Flamurtari in the final. In the Cup Winners' Cup the following season, they narrowly lost 1–0 to Dutch side Feyenoord, whom they held to a 0–0 draw in Tiranë before losing the tie to a late goal in Rotterdam.

The 1992–93 campaign proved to be last truly successful one for the club, as they managed to win their 7th double in their history. They won the Kategoria Superiore in a season where Edmond Dosti became Partizani's first league top goalscorer since Agim Murati in 1979, and they won the Albanian Cup after defeating Albpetrol Patos in the final. After winning the double Partizani faced Icelandic side ÍA Akranes in the preliminary round of the European Cup. They earned a goalless draw in the first leg in Tiranë before losing 3–0 in Akranes, where all 3 goals came in the second half. Following the fall of communism in Albania clubs struggled to support themselves financially and Partizani was also heavily reliant on the Albanian Army's support along with the communist regime. The fall of communism made it difficult for Partizani to be sustainable as a club, which in turn caused the club problems for the next 20 years.

Post-communist era (1993–2008)
After winning the double in 1993 Partizani began to decline in terms of power, and the club was taken over by businessman Albert Xhani in 1994. Because Teuta Durrës had finished 2nd in the league and won the cup, Partizani were given a place in the UEFA Cup as the third-placed team, and they faced Turkish side Fenerbahçe in 1995, whom they lost 6–0 to on aggregate as they struggled against far superior opposition. Partizani continued to struggle to compete domestically with their only success coming in 1997 as they won the Albanian Cup. The club's fortunes continued to worsen and they found themselves in bottom spot in the league and the club eventually experienced relegated for the first time in its history at the end of the 1999–00 season. The spent one season in the Albanian First Division, as they won the division title and earned promotion at the first attempt. During their first season back in the top flight they managed a respectable third-place finish which qualified them for the UEFA Cup, where they were drawn against Israeli side Hapoel Tel Aviv, whom they lost 5–1 to on aggregate as they failed to progress to the next round.
The following season they once again finished third and they also reached the quarter finals of the Albanian Cup, as they qualified for the Intertoto Cup where they were once again drawn against Israeli opposition in Maccabi Netanya, to whom they lost 3–1 to in Netanya before winning the return leg in Tiranë 2–0 against the odds to qualify for the next round of a European competition for only the second time. In the next round they faced Moldovan side Dacia Chișinău to whom they lost 5–0 on aggregate to, putting an end to their Intertoto Cup run. Domestically they managed a fourth-place finish, just one point behind Vllaznia Shkodër in third place, and they also won the Albanian Cup, which was the first major trophy by the club in 11 years, aside from the Albanian First Division. In the UEFA Cup the following season Partizani was drawn against Maltese side Birkirkara, whom they beat 4–2 in the first leg in Tiranë, and despite losing 2–1 in the away leg they managed to qualify for the next round where they faced Israeli side Hapoel Bnei Sakhnin who defeated Partizani 6–1 on aggregate to eliminate them, following 3–0 and 3–1 away and home losses, respectively. During the 2004–05 campaign Partizani struggled in the league and they finished third from bottom, although they were not in real danger of being relegated as they finished 22 points away from the relegation zone. In the cup they narrowly lost out to eventual winners Teuta Durrës in the semi finals, as they lost out on the away goal rule following a 2–2 aggregate draw. The following season performances improved and they finished fourth, just 2 points behind local rivals KF Tirana in second place, as they also reached the quarter finals of the cup. They qualified for the Intertoto Cup once again, where they faced Cypriot side Ethnikos Achna who Partizani defeated 2–1 in Tiranë but lost 4–2 to in Achnas to lose 5–4 on aggregate. The 2006–07 campaign saw the club finish fourth once again, and they also missed out on reaching the final of the Albanian Cup on the away goal rule after a 1–1 aggregate draw with Teuta Durrës. The following season Partizani challenged for the title with local rivals Dinamo Tirana, but they were unable to win the league and they eventually finished 5 points away from Dinamo as they finished as runners up for the 19th time.

Downfall and revival (2008–present)
After a strong season, Partizani qualified the UEFA Cup and faced Bosnian side Široki Brijeg in the first qualifying round, but they eventually lost 3–1 on aggregate which was the start to what would prove to be a very difficult season, as they struggled in the league and avoided the automatic relegation zone by a single goal on goal difference. They did however face Kastrioti Krujë in a relegation play-out that led to Partizani's relegation once again, in a game that was marred by poor refereeing decisions as well as violence. Partizani began the 2009–10 campaign in the Albanian First Division and the club's president Albert Xhani began to withdraw from backing the club financially, which meant that the majority of wages were not paid for the season and during the winter break Paro Laci and Lulëzim Sallaku bought out 40% and 10% of the club's shares, respectively, with Xhani retaining the remaining 50%. Laci took control of the majority of the club's finances, and wages were paid to the staff and the players, but despite push for promotion they were unable to reach the play off places and finished the league in 4th place. The 2010–11 season would prove to be the worst in the club's history as they experienced relegation to the Albanian Second Division, the third tier, for the first time, as they were relegated for the 2nd time in 2 years. The club finished bottom of the First Division table, with a record of 4 wins, 5 draws and 21 losses, scoring a total of just 16 goals in 30 games. During the first and only season in the Second Division, Partizani managed to finish top of Group B by a single point, which guaranteed their promotion and their qualification to the championship final against Tërbuni Pukë on 17 May 2012, which ended in a 3–1 loss for Partizani. The club's return to the First Division would prove to be a successful one as they finished as runners up behind KF Lushnja to achieve back to back promotion, in a season that saw the club change ownership as Gazment Demi bought out 50% of the club's shares in January 2013, making him and Lulëzim Sallaku co-owners and co-financiers of the club. The club achieved promotion back into the Kategoria Superiore following a four-year absence and Demi took over as president following the departure of Sallaku from the post.

After 5 seasons of winning nothing in the Kategoria Superiore, Partizani won its first title in 26 years, under coach Skënder Gega, and return to UEFA Champions League after 3 years of absence.

Stadium

During the club's early history they played their home games at Albania's main stadium, the Qemal Stafa Stadium which was shared with local rivals KF Tirana and then also Dinamo Tirana. A second stadium was built in Tiranë in 1956, which was the Selman Stërmasi Stadium, and this stadium was also shared by the three main Tiranë clubs. The club stopped sharing the Selman Stërmasi Stadium in 2014 when they were promoted back to the Kategoria Superiore, and in the summer of 2016 the process of demolishing the Qemal Stafa Stadium will begin, in order to facilitate the proposed 22,500-seater Arena Kombëtare.

On 9 March 2016, the Albanian government agreed to a 99-year, €1 lease of the  Military Base 4030, located on Myslym Keta Road on the outskirts of Tiranë, which is where Partizani will build their new training complex as well as their proposed 4,500 seater stadium.

Tirana's mayor, in a meeting with FK Partizani and FK Tirana, granted Partizani the right to play in Tirana's stadium until "Qemal Stafa Stadium" is finished building.

In 2019, Partizani moved to the newly built Arena Kombëtare. On 13 December 2019, they played first match at the new stadium against rivals KF Tirana, which also plays some matches at the stadium. They lost the match 2–1 with a Winful Cobbinah goal at the last minute of the match, which was the first loss for the club in the derbies after 5 years and 8 months and after 18 games.

Supporters

Ultras Guerrils
Partizani Tirana's current supporters group and hooligans firm is called Ultras Guerrils 08–09, who were founded following the merger of two other supports groups, Brigada e Kuqe 08 and Komandos Ultras. They are one of the most numerous and consistent supporters in Albania, attending the team's Albanian Second Division matches. Despite their history, name and colours they aren't affiliated with any political party. Partizani has a lot of supporter abroad Albania, such as Kosovo-Albanians and also a lot of Macedonian Albanians

Rivalries

The club's biggest rivalry is with KF Tirana. The Tirana derby is the name given to any football match contested between Partizani Tirana and KF Tirana football clubs, the two biggest rivals in Tirana in Albania. Partizani Tirana have a historical advantage of 25 wins ahead of KF Tirana in the League with 67 wins. Also the team recorded the best ever result in the match which still remains as 8-0 from 1947. The other main rivalry in the city is with Dinamo Tirana.

Recent seasons

Divisional movements

Honours

FK Partizani in Europe

Notes
 QR: Qualifying round
 1R: First round
 2R: Second round
Note 1:Partizani Tirana was transferred to 2016–17 UEFA Champions League second qualifying round following the exclusion of KF Skënderbeu Korçë by UEFA for match-fixing.
Note 2:Skënderbeu Korçë would have qualified for the Champions League second qualifying round as the champions of the 2015–16 Kategoria Superiore, but were excluded from participating in the 2016–17 European competitions by UEFA for match-fixing. They appealed the decision to the Court of Arbitration for Sport, and UEFA agreed to suspend the exclusion and Skënderbeu Korçë were included in the second qualifying round draw. The final decision to exclude Skënderbeu Korçë was made by the Court of Arbitration for Sport on 6 July 2016, before the second qualifying round was played. As a result, the berth was given to the runners-up Partizani Tirana.

Players

Current squad

Out on loan

Other players under contract

Current staff

Historical list of coaches

 Sllave Llambi (1946–1949)
 Myslym Alla (1954–1956)
 Nikolay Lyukshinov (1956–1957)
 Rexhep Spahiu (1956–1962)
 Loro Boriçi (1962–1971)
 Bejkush Birçe (1969–1972)
 Ilia Shuke (1974–1977)
 Bejkush Birçe (1978–1984)
 Neptun Bajko (1986–1988)
 Kolec Kraja (1988–1989)
 Sulejman Starova (1990–1994)
 Hasan Lika (1994–1995)
 Ramadan Shehu (1995–1996)
 Sulejman Starova (1996–1997)
 Perlat Musta (1997–1998)
 Edmond Gëzdari (1998–1999)
 Genc Tomorri (2000–2001)
 Neptun Bajko (2001)
 Nikolay Arabov (2001)
 Shpëtim Duro (2001–2002)
 Tiziano Gori (2002)
 Neptun Bajko (2002–2003)
 Ilir Spahiu (2003)
 Sulejman Mema (2003–2004)
 Ilir Shulku (2004)
 Ramadan Shehu (5 Oct 2004 – 20 Oct 2004)
 Sulejman Mema (2004–2005)
 Neptun Bajko (Jul 2005 – 17 Sep 2005)
 Sulejman Mema (17 Sep 2005 – 16 Nov 2005)
 Sulejman Starova (16 Nov 2005 – Jun 2006)
 Neptun Bajko (Jul 2006 – 2 Nov 2007)
 Hasan Lika (2 Nov 2006 – 26 Oct 2008)
 Shpëtim Duro (26 Oct 2008 – May 2009)
 Skerdi Bejzade (2009–2010)
 Gerd Haxhiu (2010)
 Neptun Bajko (2010–2011)
 Ylli Shehu (2011)
 Perlat Musta (2012)
 Nikolin Coçlli (Jul 2012 – 25 Nov 2012)
 Shpëtim Duro (25 Nov 2012 – 4 Mar 2013)
 Hasan Lika (4 Mar 2013 – 10 Feb 2014)
 Márcio Sampaio (10 Feb 2014 – 6 May 2014)
 Genc Tomorri (6 May 2014 – Jun 2014)
 Shpëtim Duro (2014–2015)
 Sulejman Starova (Jul 2015 – 4 Jan 2016)
 Andrea Agostinelli (4 Jan 2016 – Jun 2016)
 Klevis Dalipi (Jun 2016 – Jul 2016)
 Adolfo Sormani (Jul 2016 – Oct 2016)
 Sulejman Starova (Oct 2016 – Jul 2017)
 Mark Iuliano (Jul 2017 – Nov 2017)
 Sulejman Starova (Nov 2017 – Mar 2018)
 Klevis Dalipi (Mar 2018 – Jun 2018)
 Skënder Gega (Jul 2018 – May 2019)
 Franco Lerda (Jun 2019 – Dec 2019)
 Renaldo Kalari (Dec 2019 – Jan 2020)
 Adolfo Sormani (Jan 2020 – Jun 2020)
 Ilir Daja (Jun 2020 – Dec 2021)
 Dritan Mehmeti (Dec 2021 – Aug 2022) 
 Giovanni Colella (Aug 2022 – )

Title winning managers

Sponsorship

References

Notes

Sources

External links

Partizani at UEFA.COM

 
Association football clubs established in 1946
Football clubs in Albania
Military association football clubs
Football clubs in Tirana
1946 establishments in Albania
Kategoria e Dytë clubs